Drat! The Cat! is a musical with a book and lyrics by Ira Levin and music by Milton Schafer.

Originally called Cat and Mouse, this spoof of late-Victorian melodrama has at its core Alice Van Guilder, who wants to be a career girl at a time when nice young ladies marry well instead of having careers. Frustrated by the obstacles standing in her way, she becomes a cat burglar and plunders the homes of Manhattan's high society in the 1890s.

After an out-of-town try-out at the Shubert Theatre in Philadelphia in September, 1965, and 11 previews, the Broadway production, presented by Jerry Adler and Norman Rosemont, directed and choreographed by Joe Layton, opened on October 10, 1965 at the Martin Beck Theatre, where it ran for only eight performances. The cast included Lesley Ann Warren, Elliott Gould, Charles Durning, Jane Connell, and Beth Howland. Conductor Herbert Grossman served as Music Director and Clare Grundman wrote the orchestra score. Warren won the Theatre World Award for her performance, and the show was nominated for a Tony Award for Best Scenic Design. 
 
A demo recording of the pre-Broadway Philadelphia show was released as a demo-only lp on Capitol Custom (TB-504) in 1965. Long after the show closed, Blue Pear Records issued an original cast album from a recording surreptitiously made during a live performance. Gould's wife at the time, Barbra Streisand, had a hit with her recording of "He Touched Me", a gender-reversed version of one of the show's songs, which went to number two on the Easy Listening chart. On the B-side of that single, Streisand recorded "I Like Him", also from the show. In 1997, Varèse Sarabande released a studio recording featuring Susan Egan, Jason Graae, Judy Kaye, Bryan Batt, Jonathan Freeman, and Elaine Stritch.  The recording was produced by Bruce Kimmel.

Musical numbers

Act I
Scene 1: Various Places in New York City
 "Drat! The Cat!" – Citizens, Patrolman, The Mayor, Pincer and Mallet
Scene 2: A Bedroom in The Purefoy's Flat
 "My Son, Uphold the Law" – Roger Purefoy and Patrolmen
Scene 3: Lucius Van Guilder's Study and Counting Room
 "Holmes and Watson" – Alice Van Guilder and Bob Purefoy
 "She Touched Me" – Bob
Scene 4: Alice Van Guilder's Boudoir and A Secret Chamber
 "Wild and Reckless" – Alice
Scene 5: The Purefoy's Kitchen
 "She's Roses" – Bob and Kate Purefoy
Scene 6: Pier Fourteen
 "Ballet: "Ignoble Theft of The Idol's Eyes"" – The Cat, Patrolman, and Attendants of the Idol
Scene 7: Van Guilder's Study and The Garden
 "Dancing with Alice – Bob, Alice, Mr. & Mrs. Van Guilder, and Guests
 "Drat! The Cat! (Reprise)" – Mr. & Mrs. Van Guilder and Guests
Scene 8: The Van Guilder's Cellar
 "Purefoy's Lament" – Bob

Act II
Scene 1: Police Headquarters
 "A Pox Upon the Traitor's Brow" – Pincer, Mallet, Emma & Patrolman
Scene 2: The Cellar
 "Deep in Your Heart" – Bob
Scene 3: Van Guilder's Study
 "Let's Go" – Alice and Bob
 "It's Your Fault" – Mr. & Mrs. Van Guilder
Scene 4: The Woods North of The City
 "Wild and Reckless (Reprise)" – Bob
Scene 5: Various Places in The City
 "Ballet: "The Upside-Down Thief"" – Bob, Citizens, Patrolman & Kate
Scene 6: The Woods and The City
 "Today is a Day for a Band to Play" – Pincer, Mallet, Emma, Patrolman, and Citizens
 "She Touched Me (Reprise)" – Bob and Alice
Scene 7: Van Guilder's Study
 "I Like Him" – Alice
Scene 8: A Courtroom
 "Justice Triumphant" – Entire Company
 "Today is a Day for a Band to Play (Reprise)" – Entire Company

References

External links
 Internet Broadway Database listing
The Guide to Musical Theatre

1965 musicals
Broadway musicals
Works by Ira Levin